Danwel Demas (born 15 October 1981) is a South African rugby union player who most recently played for the . He previously played for Italian club Aironi in the Pro12, and for the Bulls and Cheetahs in Super Rugby. He represented South Africa in sevens, in 2003 and from 2005 to 2007. In 2012, he joined the Pumas and represented them in the Vodacom Cup and the Currie Cup competitions until the end of 2013.

Demas also represented the Emerging Springboks from 2006 to 2009.

Durbanville-Bellville

In 2015, he joined Western Province club side Durbanville-Bellville and was a member of the squad that won the 2015 SARU Community Cup competition, scoring one tries in five appearances in the competition.

References

External links
 

1981 births
Living people
South African rugby union players
Pumas (Currie Cup) players
Bulls (rugby union) players
Blue Bulls players
Cheetahs (rugby union) players
Free State Cheetahs players
Boland Cavaliers players
Sportspeople from Paarl
Rugby union wings
Aironi players
South Africa international rugby sevens players
Rugby sevens players at the 2006 Commonwealth Games
Commonwealth Games rugby sevens players of South Africa